This is a list of notable Jewish American poets.  For other Jewish Americans, see Lists of Jewish Americans.

Persons listed with a double asterisks (**) are winners of the Pulitzer Prize for Poetry.

 David Antin, poet, critic and performance artist
 Rosebud Ben-Oni, poet and writer
 Joseph Brodsky, Nobel Prize winner, and U.S. Poet Laureate
 Richard Chess, poet and academic
Edith Covensky, poet, Professor of Hebrew and Israeli Studies at Wayne State University
 Celia Dropkin, poet
 David Edelshtadt, poet
 Norman Finkelstein, poet and literary critic
 Allen Ginsberg, beat poet
 Jacob Glatstein, poet
 Moyshe-Leyb Halpern, poet
 Stanley Kunitz, poet
 D.L. Lang, poet  
 Emma Lazarus, poet
 Mani Leib, poet
 Jeffrey Levine, poet
 Anna Margolin, poet
 Adah Isaacs Menken (1835?-1868), actress and poet
 Penina Moise, poet
 Howard Nemerov, poet
 Alicia Ostriker, poet and scholar
 Charles Reznikoff, poet
 Morris Rosenfeld, poet
 Muriel Rukeyser, poet
 Delmore Schwartz, poet and essayist
 Karl Shapiro, poet, editor and academic
 Fradl Shtok, poet
 Marcela Sulak, poet
 Samuel Ullman, poet 
 Louis Untermeyer, poet and anthologist 

 Yehoash, poet

See also

Jewish American literature
List of Yiddish language poets
List of Jewish American authors
List of Jewish American playwrights
Multi-Ethnic Literature of the United States
Before Columbus Foundation

References

 

Poets
Jewish
Jewish American
Jewish